The 1990 Mid-American Conference men's basketball tournament took place March 9–11, 1990, at Cobo Arena in Detroit, Michigan. Ball State defeated , 78–56 in the championship game, to win its second straight (3rd overall) MAC Tournament title.

The Cardinals earned the conference's automatic bid to the 1990 NCAA tournament as No. 12 seed in the West region. In the round of 64, Ball State defeated Oregon State, led by Gary Payton, 54–53. The Cardinals then knocked off Louisville, 62–60, to make the first Sweet Sixteen appearance in program history. Though their cinderella run would end, Ball State was up to the challenge, falling to No. 1 seed and eventual national champion UNLV by just two points, 69–67.

Format
Eight of nine conference members participated, with  left out of the competition due to their last place finish in the regular season standings.

Bracket

References

1990
Tournament
MAC men's basketball tournament
MAC men's basketball tournament